Celebration is the third studio album by new age composer Deuter. It was released in 1976 on Kuckuck Schallplatten.

Track listing

Personnel
Adapted from the Celebration liner notes.
 Deuter – flute, guitar,  synthesizer, musical arrangement, production, photography, design
 Ulrike Leib – photography
 Manfred Manke – design

Release history

References

External links 
 

1976 albums
Deuter albums
Kuckuck Schallplatten albums